These companies were all leased by or merged into the Public Service Corporation of New Jersey, a street railway company. Some companies were leased or merged after they were bustituted; those are not listed here.

Public Service Railway

Jersey City, Hoboken and Paterson Railway
Bergen Turnpike Company
New Jersey Electric Railway
Jersey City, Hoboken and Rutherford Electric Railway
Paterson, Passaic and Rutherford Electric Railway
Grant Street Electric Railway
Passaic, Rutherford and Carlstadt Electric Railway
Paterson and Little Falls Electric Railway
Paterson and Passaic Electric Railway
Paterson, Rutherford and Carlstadt Electric Railway
People's Park Railway
North Hudson County Railway
Hudson and Bergen Traction Company
Palisades Railroad
Pavonia Horse Railroad
Paterson Horse Railroad
Paterson Railway
Paterson City Railroad
Paterson, Garfield and Clinton Railway
Paterson and Passaic Railroad
Paterson Central Electric Railway
Central Electric Railway
Paterson Central Railway
Paterson and State Line Traction Company
Saddle River Traction Company
White Line Traction Company

North Jersey Street Railway
Consolidated Traction Company of New Jersey
Jersey City, Harrison and Kearney Railway
New Jersey Traction Company
Jersey City and Bergen Railroad
Newark Passenger Railway
Elizabeth Passenger Railway
Essex Passenger Railway
Hudson and Bergen Railway
Newark and Irvington Street Railway
Rapid Transit Railway of the City of Newark
Newark Plank Road Company
Newark and South Orange Railway
Newark, South Orange, Ferry Street and Hamilton Place Railroad
Newark and South Orange Horse Car Railroad
Passaic and Newark Electric Traction Company
Passaic and Newark Electric Railway
South Orange and Maplewood Traction Company

Orange and Passaic Valley Railway
Suburban Traction Company

References

New Jersey Transit subsidiaries

The Public Service Trolley Lines In New Jersey; by Edward Hamm, Jr.; 1991; Transportation Trails. Polo, Illinois.

Public Service